The International Contact Group on the Mano River Basin (ICG-MRB) is an ad-hoc formed International Contact Group created to liaise in the situation in Liberia.

It is the successor to the International Contact Group on Liberia, with an expanded remit to deal with the entire Mano River basin region.

References

See also 
 Mano River Union

International organizations based in Africa
Diplomatic umbrella groups